Anna Gavendová-Handzlová (July 4, 1946, Třinec – May 10, 2020, Třinec) was an orienteering competitor who competed for Czechoslovakia. At the 1972 World Orienteering Championships in Jičín she placed 14th in the individual competition, and won a bronze medal in the relay, together with Naďa Mertová and Renata Vlachová. At the 1974 World Orienteering Championships in Viborg she placed 12th in the individual race, and won a bronze medal in the relay, together with Dana Procházková and Renata Vlachová.

References

1946 births
2020 deaths
Czechoslovak orienteers
Female orienteers
Foot orienteers
World Orienteering Championships medalists
Sportspeople from Třinec
Czech orienteers